Pontiac is a regional county municipality in the Outaouais region of Quebec, Canada. Campbell's Bay is the county seat. It should not be confused with the municipality of Pontiac, which is located in the neighbouring Les Collines-de-l'Outaouais Regional County Municipality. For the electoral district see Pontiac (electoral district).

Subdivisions
There are 18 subdivisions within the RCM:

Municipalities (15)
 Alleyn-et-Cawood
 Bristol
 Bryson
 Campbell's Bay
 Clarendon
 L'Île-du-Grand-Calumet
 L'Isle-aux-Allumettes
 Litchfield
 Mansfield-et-Pontefract
 Otter Lake
 Rapides-des-Joachims
 Shawville
 Sheenboro
 Thorne
 Waltham

Townships (1)
 Chichester

Villages (2)
 Fort-Coulonge
 Portage-du-Fort

Unorganized Territory (1)
 Lac-Nilgaut

Demographics

Population

Language

Transportation

Access Routes
Highways and numbered routes that run through the municipality, including external routes that start or finish at the county border:

 Autoroutes
 None

 Principal Highways
 

 Secondary Highways
 
 
 

 External Routes

See also
 List of regional county municipalities and equivalent territories in Quebec
 Esprit Lodge
 Cycloparc PPJ

References

External links

 Official tourism website of Pontiac MRC
 Affaires Municipales et Regions Quebec